Malisheva is a town and municipality in Kosovo. According to the Kosovo Agency of Statistics (KAS) estimate from the 2011 census, there were 54,613 people residing in Malisheva Municipality, with Kosovo Albanians constituting the majority of the population.

History 

The population of the town has historically been predominantly Kosovo Albanian. The town was largely destroyed by Serbian forces in 1998.  Town residents only returned following the 1998 withdrawal of Serbian paramilitary police and military, in response to international pressures.

Demography 

According to the Kosovo Agency of Statistics (KAS) estimate from the 2011 census, there were 54,613 people residing in Malisheva Municipality. With a population density of 178,5 people per square kilometre, its urban population amounted to about 3,300, while the rural population was around 51,200.

See also 
Trpeza mine

Notes

References

External links 

Municipality of MalishevaOfficial Website

Malisheva
Malisheva
Populated places in Prizren District